Kata-kat or taka-tak is a special meat dish popular throughout Pakistan. It is a dish originating from Karachi, Pakistan made from offal (i.e., a mixture of various meat organs), including testicles, brain, kidney, heart, liver, lungs and lamb chops in butter. The dish's name is an onomatopoeia from the sound of the two sharp blades that hit the griddle as they cut up the meat. It is still an open question whether the correct name is tak-a-tak or kata-kat.

Cookware 
Kata Kat uses flatter version of Karahi as a griddle and two flat short handled Karahi spatulas or implement resembling putty knives as cutting and stir-frying device.

See also 
 Stir fried ice cream

References

Pakistani cuisine